WYRD (1330 kHz), known on-air as "The Fan Upstate", is a sports-formatted AM radio station in the Greenville-Spartanburg area of Upstate South Carolina. The Audacy, Inc. outlet is licensed by the FCC to Greenville, South Carolina, and broadcasts with power of 5 kW non-directional daytime and 3-way directional at night.  The programming is simultaneously broadcast on WORD 950 AM Spartanburg, W249DL 97.7 MHz, Greenville and W246CV 97.1 MHz, Spartanburg.  Its studios and transmitter are located in Greenville.

History
On December 9, 1932, the Federal Radio Commission approved transferring the license for WFBC (the station's call letters at that time) from Virgil V. Evans to the Greensville News-Piedmont Company. At the time, WFBC operated on 1200 kHz with 50 watts of power. On January 8, 1935, the Federal Communications Commission approved increasing the station's power to 5,000 watts.

Years later, WFBC was known for its top-40 format. The call letters continue to be used by WFBC-FM.  

Until their change in format from talk to sports on February 24, 2014, News Radio WORD carried Russ and Lisa, Mike Gallagher, Coast to Coast AM, Rush Limbaugh, Kim Komando, Lars Larson, Dave Ramsey, Sean Hannity and Bob McLain. WYRD-FM now airs the talk format that was once simulcast on WORD (AM), and on the FM station starting in 2008.

WYRD and its associated FM translator signals became "ESPN Upstate" in February 2014.  The station began with ESPN Radio programming, except during the afternoon drive slot, which was hosted locally by Greenville-Spartanburg radio veteran Greg McKinney.  Later in 2014, McKinney's show "The Huddle" moved to early afternoons, and Mark Sturgis took over the afternoon drive slot.  McKinney retired from the station in January 2019, and the early afternoon show was taken over by Marc Ryan.  Sturgis has had extended absences from the station for health reasons and a variety of substitute hosts have filled in.

On March 23, 2022, WYRD and its FM translators rebranded as "The Fan Upstate" and switched affiliations from ESPN Radio to CBS Sports Radio and BetQL Network.

References

External links

YRD (AM)
Audacy, Inc. radio stations
CBS Sports Radio stations
Radio stations established  in 1933
1933 establishments in South Carolina